Rian McBride (born 1996) is an Irish hurler who plays for Dublin Senior Championship club St. Vincent's and at inter-county level with the Dublin senior hurling team. He usually lines out at midfield.

Career

A member of the St. Vincent's club in Marino, McBride first came to prominence on the inter-county scene with the Dublin minor team in 2014. He subsequently won a Leinster Under-21 Championship medal with the Dublin under-21 team, while simultaneously lining out with the Dublin Institute of Technology in the Fitzgibbon Cup. McBride made his senior debut during the 2015 Walsh Cup.

Honours

Dublin
Walsh Cup: 2016
Leinster Under-21 Hurling Championship: 2016

References

External links
Rian McBride profile at the Dublin GAA website

1996 births
Living people
St Vincents (Dublin) hurlers
Dublin inter-county hurlers